Bergur Sigurbjörnsson (20 May 1917 – 28 July 2005) was an Icelandic magazine editor and politician.

He studied business in the University of Iceland, and later went on to study economics in Stockholm University. He founded the weekly magazine, Frjáls þjóð ('Free Nation') in 1952, and was the magazine's editor until 1967. He was a prominent supporter of Hannibal Valdimarsson's campaign to be elected to the Alþing as an independent. He himself ventured into politics, forming the National Preservation Party in 1953, for which he was a member between 1953 and 1956.

He was a proponent of complete self-determination for Iceland, and as such, strongly opposed both Iceland's membership of NATO and the 1951 American occupation of Iceland.

Bergur Sigurbjornsson
1917 births
2005 deaths
Stockholm University alumni
National Preservation Party politicians